Scaly may refer to:
 something with the appearance of a scale
 Scaly-breasted lorikeet (Trichoglossus chlorolepidotus), a bird species found in woodland in eastern Australia

See also 
 Scale (disambiguation)